Kunar Hembram, is an engineer turned Indian parliamentarian. He was elected to the Lok Sabha (the lower house of the Parliament of India) from Jhargram, West Bengal in the 2019 Indian general election as a member of the Bharatiya Janata Party.

References

External links
Official biographical sketch in Parliament of India website

India MPs 2019–present
Lok Sabha members from West Bengal
Living people
Bharatiya Janata Party politicians from West Bengal
1962 births
People from Jhargram district